Tim Griffin is an American film and television actor best known for his roles in Grey's Anatomy, Prime Suspect, Covert Affairs and Wayward Pines.

Early life
Griffin was raised in Chicago, Illinois. He studied English and political philosophy at the University of Vermont.

Career
Often dubbed ""the actor who is in everything" Griffin has had an extensive career in television and film. Some of his film credits include Cloverfield, Leatherheads, The Men Who Stare at Goats, A Better Life, American Sniper, Super 8, Abduction and Central Intelligence.

A few of his more notable television roles are Adam Hassler on Wayward Pines, Ron Kellaher on Aquarius, Ronny O'Malley on Grey's Anatomy, Seth Newman on Covert Affairs and Detective Augie Blando on Prime Suspect.

Personal life
Griffin is married to Alicia Carr, they have two children.

Filmography

Films

Television

References

External links
 

Living people
American male television actors
American male film actors
American male voice actors
Male actors from Chicago
20th-century American male actors
21st-century American male actors
Year of birth missing (living people)